Tang Kwok Cheung (born April 20, 1965) is a Hong Kong sprint canoer who competed in the mid to late 1980s. At the 1984 Summer Olympics in Los Angeles, he was eliminated in the repechages of both the K-2 500 m and the K-4 1000 m events. Four years later in Seoul, Tang was eliminated in the semifinals of the K-1 500 m event.

External links
Sports-Reference.com profile

1965 births
Canoeists at the 1984 Summer Olympics
Canoeists at the 1988 Summer Olympics
Hong Kong male canoeists
Living people
Olympic canoeists of Hong Kong
Canoeists at the 1990 Asian Games
Asian Games competitors for Hong Kong